Kassem Taher Saleh (born 1 June 1993) is a German civil engineer and politician of the Alliance 90/The Greens who has been serving as a member of the Bundestag since the 2021 German federal election, representing the Dresden I district.

Early life and education
Taher grew up in Plauen, Vogtland, Germany. He studied civil engineering at TU Dresden and University of Cantabria.

Political career
Taher joined the Greens in 2019. In parliament, he serves on the Committee on Housing, Urban Development, Building and Local Government.

Other activities
 German Industry Initiative for Energy Efficiency (DENEFF), Member of the Parliamentary Advisory Board
 IG Bauen-Agrar-Umwelt (IG BAU), Member
 Dynamo Dresden, Member

References

External links 
 

Living people
1993 births
People from Zakho
German civil engineers
Iraqi civil engineers
21st-century German politicians
Members of the Bundestag for Alliance 90/The Greens
Members of the Bundestag 2021–2025
Iraqi emigrants to Germany
Naturalized citizens of Germany
TU Dresden alumni
University of Cantabria alumni
German people of Kurdish descent